Joseph F. Lisa (born January 20, 1937) is an American politician who served in the New York State Assembly from 1969 to 1976 and in the New York City Council from the 34th district from 1983 to 1991.

References

1937 births
Living people
Democratic Party members of the New York State Assembly
New York City Council members